A bressummer, breastsummer, summer beam (somier, sommier, sommer, somer, cross-somer, summer, summier, summer-tree, or dorman, dormant tree) is a load-bearing beam in a timber-framed building. The word summer derived from sumpter or French sommier, "a pack horse", meaning  "bearing great burden or weight". "To support a superincumbent wall", "any beast of burden", and in this way is similar to a wall plate.

The use and definition of these terms vary but generally a bressummer is a jetty sill and a summer is an interior beam supporting ceiling joists, see below:
 (UK) In the outward part of the building, and the middle floors (not in the garrets or ground floors) into which the girders are framed. In the inner parts of a building, such beams are called "summers". It is part of the timber-frame construction in the overhanging upper story in jettying.
 (UK) "Horizontal beam over a fireplace opening (alternatively lintel, mantel beam), or set forward from the lower part of a building to support a jettied wall, a jetty bressummer".
 (UK) "...usually the sill of the upper wall above a jetty; otherwise any beam spanning an opening and supporting a wall above." also called a "jetty sill".
 (UK)  Breastsummer is a beam in a wall which carries the load over a large opening derived from breast being in the front, mid-level and summer: "A horizontal, bearing beam in a building; spec. the main beam supporting the girders or joists of a floor...".
 "a main piece of timber that supports a building, an architrave between two pillars"
 "Breast-Summer, an architectural term for a beam employed like a lintel to support the front of a building, is a corruption of bressumer..."
 (US) "Summer beam: A large timber spanning a room and supporting smaller floor joists on both sides."
 (US) "Summer beam. Heavy main horizontal beam, anchored in gable foundation walls, that supports forebay beams and barn frame above."

References

Architectural elements
Structural system
Timber framing